Simon Wilson (born 1 August 1980) is a British track and road racing cyclist, who last rode for UCI Continental team . Wilson won a bronze medal in the team pursuit at the 2011 British National Track Championships and 2018 British National Track Championships.

References

External links

1980 births
British male cyclists
Living people